Grace Phang (born 13 September 1985) is a Malaysian racing cyclist who rides for the Al'Asayl Cycling Team. In 2016, she was the Malaysian national individual time trial champion.

See also
 List of 2018 UCI Women's Teams and riders

References

External links
 

1985 births
Living people
Malaysian female cyclists
Place of birth missing (living people)